Aborigine, aborigine or aboriginal may refer to:

Aborigines (mythology), in Roman mythology
 Indigenous peoples, general term for ethnic groups who are the earliest known inhabitants of an area
One of several groups of indigenous peoples, see List of indigenous peoples, including:
Aboriginal Australians (Aborigine is an archaic term that is considered offensive)
Indigenous peoples in Canada, also known as Aboriginal Canadians
Orang Asli or Malayan aborigines
Taiwanese indigenous peoples, formerly known as Taiwanese aborigines

See also

Australian Aboriginal English
Australian Aboriginal identity 
Aboriginal English in Canada
First Nations (disambiguation)